The siege of Astarabad took place in June 1908 when Mohammad Baqir Khan Salar Akram was commissioned by the authoritarian government of Mohammad Ali Shah to take Astarabad (modern-day Gorgan) from the constitutionalists. Astarabad was located in a very important strategic region because on the one hand it had access to Russia and on the other hand it was a region with the necessary strength for emergencies. Salar Akram reached the gates of Astarabad in June 1908, a week after the bombing of the parliament with his army, but Sardar Rafi Yansari, Wali of the province of Astarabad, did not allow him to enter, which led to a three-month siege; But in the end, Salar Akram was killed in a clash and the constitutionalists won. After that, a group of authoritarians revolted against Sardar Rafi, and in the end, Sardar Rafi defeated all of them.

Background 
Astarabad, with an area of about 150 hectares, was one of the most important commercial-agricultural areas of Iran since the Achaemenid period. During the constitutional period, because of its access to Russia and its ports in the Caspian Sea, it was of great value to the Qajar kings, especially Mohammad Ali Shah, who considered Astarabad a region through which he could escape to Russia. Astarabad at this time was under the rule of Sardar Rafie Yanehsari, who, with the developments he had made, had made Astarabad a region familiar with modernity in such a way that it had become centers of enlightenment.

During the reign of Muzaffar al-Din Shah, the merchant class gradually made a pact with Sardar Rafi to support them in the constitutional movement; This move caused Sardar Rafi to close the Astarabad trade route to Tehran and boycott the capital in order to put pressure on Muzaffar al-Din Shah. Eventually, under pressure from the constitutionalists, Mozaffar ad-Din Shah signed the 1906 constitution and died shortly afterwards.

In Tehran 
Following numerous conflicts between the Shah and the Majlis in 1907 and 1908, on June 25, 1908, Mohammad Ali Shah left Tehran for Bagh-e Shah, and five days later, in a telegram to the entire country, he blamed the constitutionalists for shaking the Iranian government. The arrival of the news of the Shah's movements in Tehran caused unrest in Astarabad and other cities. After strengthening his military forces, Mohammad Ali Shah commissioned the Cossack Brigade under Liakhov to break the parliamentary resistance. On June 23, 1908, the parliament was bombed, the constitutionalists were defeated after suffering many casualties, and a large crowd looted the National Assembly, the offices of the constitutionalist parties, and the homes of the constitutional leaders. Following the victory of the coup, the Shah dissolved the National Assembly and declared martial law in Tehran. Liakhov became the military governor of Tehran, and 39 constitutionalists were taken prisoner. Sardar Rafi strengthened the positions of Astarabad and asked the people of Astarabad for peace. He immediately asked Tabriz for help, but at the same time, Tabriz was in crisis during the riots between the authoritarian and constitutionalist factions and could not help. Mohammad Ali Shah ordered Mohammad Baqer Khan Salar Akram to occupy Astarabad and arrest the constitutionalists.

Arrival of Salar Akram at Astarabad and siege 
Sardar Rafi, through his border guards, noticed the arrival of Salar Akram near Astarabad. He, who was a constitutionalist and saw the possibility of a siege, ordered the collection of food. On June 29, Salar Akram arrived in Astarabad with a thousand riders and several cannons. Salar Akram requested that the gates be opened, but Sardar Rafi refused. Thus, Salar Akram ordered the siege of Astarabad and closed all the roads around the city. In a letter to Mohammad Ali Shah, Salar Akram asked for more troops, and according to Kasravi, 6,000 soldiers from Tehran joined Salar Akram. However, Salar Akram was dissatisfied with this amount, but because Tabriz was under siege at the same time, and that city was in the first place, this amount of army reached Salar Akram. The ruler of Bandar Gaz, Mustafa Khan Shokooh Al-Saltanah, who was an authoritarian, sent troops and food every week to help Salar Akram.

The historian Nazim al-Islam Kermani reported the number of defenders as 5,000 soldiers and three artillery pieces. Defenders' weapons were supplied in a variety of ways; At first, old weapons were distributed among the volunteers. These weapons had little range and were not efficient enough. Then, aid from Amir Moayed Savadkoohi arrived in Astarabad in Mazandaran. Meanwhile, the news of Tabriz that reached Astarabad, Sardar Rafi encouraged the people to continue the resistance like the Tabriz constitutionalists.

In the beginning, there was no problem in terms of food, but from the beginning of August, despite all the efforts, including the rationing of bread, the effects of the siege from February and March were still visible; Commodities became scarce, and a number of people died of starvation. One of the travel writers wrote about the situation of food: To force the people to surrender, the forces of Salar Akram threw food on the walls of the castle and spent the day and night in parties and intoxication. In early September, one of the guards opened the gates for Salar Akram and Salar Akram's soldiers stormed into Astarabad. The Maidan neighborhood was captured and the forces of Salar Akram camped there. Sardar Rafi immediately gathered his forces and went to Abbas Ali Square in front of the Maidan neighborhood and dug a trench there. Clashes continued between the two factions, with Salar Akram conquering several other neighborhoods, including Qaisaria, Duchenaran, and Nalbandan. At this time, Sardar Rafi divided his forces into two parts: part under his command, they fought in line with Salar Akram army, part under the command of Amir Khan-e Sardar, his nephew, who was responsible for retaking the occupied neighborhoods. In one of these clashes on 15 September, Salar Akram was shot dead and his besieged forces surrendered in less than two hours, thus, ending the siege.

Alignment of authoritarians and constitutionalists in velayat of Astarabad 

Velayat of Astarabad was a region with the center of Astarabad in the rule of Sardar Rafi and its area was from Maraveh Tappeh to Hezarjarib and in fact what today are Golestan province, Semnan province and the eastern part of Mazandaran province. 

The constitutionalists ended the siege with victory, and Sardar Rafie began to recover in Astarabad. Suddenly, in Bandar Gaz, Mustafa Khan Shokooh al-Saltanah, who was an authoritarian, revolted against Sardar Rafi and closed the roads from Bandar Gaz to Astarabad. In support of Shokooh al-Saltanah, Mohammad Ali Shah sent his uncle Vajihullah Mirza to Bandar-e-Gaz with 2,000 soldiers and a decree giving him the right to claim as governor of Astarabad. Meanwhile, Sardar Rafi sent his nephew, Amir Khan-e Sardar, to Bandar-e-Gaz with half of his forces. In Bandar-e-Gaz, the people revolted against Shokooh Al-Saltanah, Shokooh Al-Saltanah in a letter to Vajihullah Mirza told him not to come to Bandar-e-Gaz and to conquer Bastam instead. When Amir Khan-e Sardar arrived in Bandar-e-Gaz, the city was almost conquered by the people. With his joining the people, the pressure on Shokuh al-Saltanah increased and he finally surrendered and the control of the city passed to the constitutionalists. At the same time, Vajihullah Mirza had conquered Bastam and was moving towards Shahroud. In every village and town where he camped, he sent someone to announce on a platform: "Iran's enemies have been defeated, Mohammad Ali Shah the Great victorious." In Astarabad, a group of writers and intellectuals led by Bibi Khanoom Astarabadi and Ali Divasalar founded the Truth Association. They bought, repaired and cleaned the former palace of Agha Mohammad Khan Qajar, established the Haqiqat School there, and enrolled about a hundred poor and aristocratic children. The Truth Association taught patriotic lessons to children in the classrooms, and also corresponded with constitutionalist leaders throughout Iran, such as Mohammad Vali Khan Tonekaboni.

Another problem that occurred was the Turkmen uprising in Aq Qala. Sardar Rafif Amir Khan summoned Sardar to Astarabad and with the combination of the two corps moved to Aq Qala and defeated the Turkmen uprising within five days. After the conquest of Shahroud, Vajihullah Mirza, with the news received, asked Mohammad Baqer Haeri Mazandarani, in his speeches and sermons, to ask the people to join his army. But the people did not join the army. in november, Sardar Rafi marched towards Shahroud with all his forces. Vajihullah Mirza divided his army into three groups, the middle group under his command, the left group under Haji Mohammad Kazem Khan, and the right group under Asad Agha Fashangchi. Sardar Rafi's army was divided into two groups, the right wing under his command and the left wing under the command of Amir Khan Sardar. In the battle, Amir Khan Sardar succeeded in killing Asad Agha Fashangchi and dispersing his group. On the other hand, Sardar Rafi was fighting with Vajihullah Mirza and Haji Mohammad Kazem Khan on both sides, but Amir Khan Sardar attacked Haji Mohammad Kazem Khan's team from behind and defeated them as well. Haji Mohammad Kazem Khan's team quickly advanced and Mohammad Kazem Khan escaped. Vajihullah Mirza, besieged between the two factions, surrendered.

Aftermath 
After purging the velayat of Astarabad of all authoritarians, Sardar Rafi went to Mazandaran with his army to join the army of constitutional leaders after defeating Zahir al-Dawla.

Losses and analysis 

Kasravi put the death toll at 2,000 for constitutionalists and 3,000 for authoritarians. He also reported that 1,256 authoritarians were injured and 285 constitutionalists were injured. In terms of casualties, all historians agree with Kasravi. Kasravi considered the reasons for the defeat of the authoritarians, despite their superiority in number, in unprofessional and incoherent command, and in his opinion, The constitutionalists, led by Sardar Rafi, were able to take full advantage of the situation. Kasravi praises Amir Khan-e Sardar's courage, and he believes that the strategic game in which he defeated all the commanders of Vajihullah Mirza is a sign of his military genius. 

On the other hand, Iraj Pezeshkzad considers the reason for the victory of the constitutionalists to be the seasonal weather of autumn. He says that because the roads in northern Iran are frozen or muddy in the fall and winter, government forces sent from Tehran were not accustomed to the weather and were unable to move. In fact, he believes that if Shokooh Al-Saltanah had not been defeated at Bandar-e-Gaz, Astarabad would most likely have been conquered by the authoritarians.

Sohrab Yazdani believes that the constitutionalists had a high morale, they were willing to sacrifice their lives for the cause of constitutionalism and equality, while the authoritarian army was generally Cossack or salaried. For this reason, the constitutionalists succeeded in stopping the progress of Salar Akram and Vajihullah Mirza.

Citations

References 

Books
 
 
 
 
 
 
 
 
 
 
 
 
articles
 

Persian Constitutional Revolution
Conflicts in 1908
1908 in Iran